Washington Boulevard is an east-west arterial road in Los Angeles County, California spanning a total of 27.4 miles (44 km). 

Its western terminus is the Pacific Ocean just west of Pacific Avenue and straddling the border of the Venice Beach and Marina Peninsula neighborhoods of Los Angeles. The Boulevard extends eastbound to the city of Whittier, at Whittier Boulevard. It is south of Venice Boulevard for most of its length. At Wade Street, Washington Place is formed adjacent and parallel and lasts until just east of Sepulveda Boulevard, where it merges back into Washington Boulevard. Washington merges into Culver Boulevard briefly, but forms back into its own street at Canfield Avenue.

Washington Boulevard, which is primarily four lanes but has some six-lane sections, passes through locations in the mid-southern portion of Los Angeles County. The communities to the west include affluent areas such as Marina del Rey and Ladera Heights. Further east it passes between Crestview and Culver City and through Mid City, Arlington Heights, Pico Union, City of Commerce, Montebello, Pico Rivera, Los Nietos and Whittier.

History
The thoroughfare was known as Washington Street until around 1903.

In 1905, it boasted the headquarters of the local horse driving club, for a mile west of Western Avenue. "The road is not of the best," reported the Los Angeles Times, "and automobiles are usurping it . . . but it is the nearest approach to a speedway the reinsmen have, and they therefore make the most of it." Mayor Owen McAleer "has set aside that stretch of the highway to those drivers who delight in vying with each other off the racetrack, and policemen have been given to understand that some latitude is to be allowed horsemen there."

Transportation
Washington Boulevard provides bus service between Venice Beach and West LA Transit Center by Culver City Transit line 1, between West LA Transit Center and Downtown by Metro Local line 35, and east of Downtown by Montebello Transit line 50. A portion of the Metro A Line runs along Washington Boulevard (serving the Grand/LATTC, San Pedro and Washington stations), from Flower Street to Long Beach Avenue, while the Metro E Line serves a rail station near the intersection with National Boulevard.

Major intersections

Notable landmarks

Angelus-Rosedale Cemetery
LA Trade Tech College is located at Grand Avenue near the A Line station of the same name.
 The RPM International building (Ray Charles Enterprises) is located on the corner of Westmorland Blvd. and Washington Blvd., which is also dedicated as the "Ray Charles Square".
 The Ray Charles Post Office at La Brea Avenue.
 Government center named after David S. Cunningham, Jr., City Council member, 1973–87
 West Adams Preparatory High School is located on Vermont Avenue and Washington Blvd.

References

Streets in Los Angeles
Streets in Los Angeles County, California
Boulevards in the United States
Culver City, California
Downtown Los Angeles
Marina del Rey, California
Mid-City, Los Angeles
Montebello, California
Pico Rivera, California
Pico-Union, Los Angeles
Venice, Los Angeles
Whittier, California
West Los Angeles
Westside (Los Angeles County)